The 1972 United States presidential election in Wyoming took place on November 7, 1972. All 50 states and the District of Columbia were part of the 1972 United States presidential election. State voters chose three electors to the Electoral College, who voted for president and vice president.

Wyoming was won by the Republican nominees, incumbent President Richard Nixon of California and his running mate Vice President Spiro Agnew of Maryland. Nixon and Agnew defeated the Democratic nominees, Senator George McGovern of South Dakota and his running mate U.S. Ambassador Sargent Shriver of Maryland.

Nixon carried Wyoming with 69.01 percent of the vote to McGovern's 30.47 percent, a victory margin of 38.54 points. In a state that would reflect McGovern's national results, the Democratic nominee did not win a single county in Wyoming, making Nixon the first Republican to carry Sweetwater County and to carry all Wyoming’s counties since Warren G. Harding in 1920.

Results

Results by county

See also
 United States presidential elections in Wyoming

References

1972
Wyoming